Chandau is a village in the Ujhani block and Budaun district, Uttar Pradesh, India. Its village code is 128467. The village is administrated by Gram Panchayat.

Demographics
According to the 2011 Census of India, The total population of the village is 1,334; 729 male and 605 female.

References

Villages in Budaun district